Catherington Down is a  biological Site of Special Scientific Interest in Catherington in Hampshire. It is also a Local Nature Reserve

This western sloping site is chalk grassland with prominent lynchet strips dating to the Middle Ages. It is managed by grazing and has a variety of chalk herbs, such as pyramidal orchid, round-headed rampion and autumn lady's-tresses. There is also a narrow belt of woodland.

There is access by footpaths from Catherington Lane.

References

 

Local Nature Reserves in Hampshire
Sites of Special Scientific Interest in Hampshire